Walter David Pugh (April 4, 1863 – November 23, 1946) was an American architect based in Salem, Oregon, United States. 

The son of a carpenter, Pugh began designing buildings in Salem when there were only a few thousand residents, and in Eugene when it had a little over a thousand residents. Pugh designed Salem's Oregon State Hospital buildings being constructed in 1907-1908, including an addition to the "J Building", which has since been demolished. 

A number of his buildings are listed on the National Register of Historic Places (NRHP).

Projects on the National Register

 Shelton-McMurphey-Johnson House (1888), 303 Willamette St., Eugene
 Bush and Brey Block and Annex (1889), 179-197 Commercial St. NE, Salem, built for Asahel Bush II and Mortiz Brey, a cabinet maker
 Bush–Breyman Block (1889), 141-147 Commercial St. NE, Salem
 Independence National Bank (1891), 302 S Main St., Independence
 United Presbyterian Church and Rectory (Whitespires) (1891), 510 SW 5th Ave., Albany, with H. C. Chamberlain
 Fairbanks Hall (formerly Cauthorn Hall and Kidder Hall) (1892), Oregon State University Historic District, 220 SW 26th St., Corvallis
 Thomas Kay Woolen Mill (1895), 260 12th St. SE, Salem
 Chemeketa Lodge No. 1 Odd Fellows Buildings (Grand Theater) (1900), 185-195 High St. NE, Salem, (1921 annex designed by Morris H. Whitehouse)
 Buildings on the Oregon State Hospital campus (1907-1908), including the Eastern addition to the J Building (demolished)

Other projects
 The former Salem City Hall (1893), demolished 1972 after a bond measure to preserve it failed, corner of High and Chemeketa streets
 The dome of the second Oregon State Capitol, which burned in 1935
LeBreton Cottage (1908) at Fairview Training Center
 Crook County Courthouse (1909), located in Prineville, Oregon
 Buildings at the Chemawa Indian School

References

External links

Images of works by Pugh from the University of Oregon digital archives

1863 births
1946 deaths
Architects from Oregon
Artists from Salem, Oregon